Longiantrum is a genus of moths of the family Erebidae. The genus was erected by Michael Fibiger in 2010.

Species
Longiantrum coclea Fibiger, 2010
Longiantrum legraini Fibiger, 2010
Longiantrum burmaensis Fibiger, 2010
Longiantrum quadra Fibiger, 2010

References

Micronoctuini
Noctuoidea genera